Pentlow is a village and civil parish in the Braintree district, in the county of Essex, England. The population of the civil parish in the 2011 Census was recorded at 227. It is just south of the River Stour, and nearby settlements include the villages of Foxearth and Cavendish and the hamlet of Pentlow Street.

History 
Pentlow was recorded in the Domesday Book as Pentelawa, the name has a Norman origin. The most notable landmark in the area, St Gregory and St George's church, was built by Norman settlers and dates back as early as the 12th century. Considering the age of the Church, the condition of the Norman carvings are magnificent. Pentlow's inhabitants throughout history have mainly been agriculturally employed.

The Village

Buildings and architecture 
Pentlow houses one of six round-towered churches in Essex. Located near the border to Cavendish, the parish church is dedicated to St Gregory and St George and is a Grade I listed building.  Materials used for the church are mostly flint and pebble with a limestone and clutch cover. With various building work occurring in the past, the building dates back to as early as the 12th century. The parish church In 1870–72 the Imperial Gazetteer of England and Wales described Pentlow thus:The property is divided among a few. An octagonal tower was erected, in 1859, by the Rev. E. Bull, to the memory of his father; is a finestructure, in the Tudor style; and commands an extensive panoramic view. The living is a rectory in the diocese of Rochester. Value, £550.Including St Gregory and St George's church, Pentlow has 36 officially designated building of historical or architectural importance, protecting them from demolition or major alteration.

Services 
Due to its rural location, Pentlow's range of services are narrow. Within a 4 mile radius there are more than 15 Pubs\Hotels to stay in or visit. Transport links to Pentlow are infrequent as would be expected, however it is not so isolated. Sudbury railway station is only 4 miles from Pentlow, making a commute to London an easy option for residents. Wattisham Airfield is the closest airport, which is only 14 miles from Pentlow. Health and care services can be found only 4 miles from Pentlow.

Health and Care 
Data from the Neighbourhood Statistics Geography of Pentlow suggest that 86% of the residents are in very good - good health. This is above the average score in both categories for England.

Occupational structure 
The occupational structure of Pentlow in 1881 shows distinct patterns in employment. A large section of Pentlow's inhabitants worked within the agricultural industry making up 36% of the population. Within this segment, it is also the second largest profession of Pentlow was the clothing industry, especially the manufacturing of straw hats. There is also a correlation between gender and occupation. 1881 Pentlow fits the traditional model of a 19th century family. The majority of labour jobs were occupied by males, for example 98% of jobs in agriculture were held by males.

References

External links

 Listed buildings in Pentlow retrieved 20 September 2012
 Foxearth & District Local History Society Retrieved 20 September 2012
 Pictures from Foxearth & District Local History Society Retrieved 20 September 2012

Villages in Essex
Braintree District
Civil parishes in Essex